"Time Is Running Out" is a song by the English alternative rock band Muse. It is the third track on their third studio album, Absolution. The song was released as the second single from the album on 8 September 2003 in the United Kingdom and other countries. It was also the band's first Top 10 hit in the UK, peaking at number eight, besting the number eleven peak of "Plug In Baby".

The single was also later released in the United States on 6 April 2004. It proved to be the band's breakthrough hit on alternative rock radio in the country – hitting number nine on the Billboard Modern Rock Tracks chart.

The song is available to play on Rocksmith 2014 as part of a Muse 5-song pack.

Production and influences
Bassist Chris Wolstenholme stated that making of "Time is Running Out" is "something we'd never really done before". The song is one of the last tracks they did on the album to record. The band recorded the song and finished it when they were in Ireland. They intended the song to be more funky and a little more groovy that made someone want to click the fingers.

In an Interview, Wolstenholme also revealed that some parts of the song is heavily influenced by Michael Jackson's "Billie Jean".

Music video
The video, directed by John Hillcoat, depicts a number of military officials seated at a round table performing actions simultaneously, moving to the beat of the song, as Muse play the song on the table, with the officials apparently oblivious to Muse's presence. Eventually, the officers begin to start dancing on the table, seeming to go insane. They eventually end up crawling. It is partially based on Dr. Strangelove or: How I Learned to Stop Worrying and Love the Bomb.

Track listings
 UK 7", UK/Japanese/French CD
"Time Is Running Out" – 3:56
"The Groove" – 2:38
"Stockholm Syndrome" (video) – 4:59 (CD versions only)

 UK DVD
"Time Is Running Out" – 3:56
"Time Is Running Out" (video) – 3:58
"Time Is Running Out" (making of video) – 2:00

Charts

Weekly charts

Year-end charts

Certifications

Release history

References

External links
 Time Is Running Out lyrics – Official Muse website.

Muse (band) songs
2003 singles
2003 songs
Song recordings produced by Rich Costey
Songs written by Chris Wolstenholme
Songs written by Dominic Howard
Songs written by Matt Bellamy